The 2023 Nigerian Senate elections in Ogun State was held on 25 February 2023, to elect the 3 federal Senators from Ogun State, one from each of the state's three senatorial districts. The elections coincided with the 2023 presidential election, as well as other elections to the Senate and elections to the House of Representatives; with state elections being held two weeks later. Primaries were held between 4 April and 9 June 2022.

Background
In the previous Senate elections, none of the three incumbent senators were returned with all three retiring at the end of their terms. In the Central district election, Ibikunle Amosun (APC) gained the seat for the APC with 49% of the vote while Ramoni Olalekan Mustapha (APC) won the East district with 44%. In the West district, Tolu Odebiyi (APC) won the race with just 29% of the vote. The senatorial results were a continuation of APC control in the state as the party also gained won most House of Representatives seats, won a majority in the House of Assembly, and won the gubernatorial election along with Buhari winning the state in the presidential election.

Overview

Summary

Ogun Central 

The Ogun Central Senatorial District covers the local government areas of Abeokuta North, Abeokuta South, Ewekoro, Ifo, Obafemi Owode, and Odeda. Incumbent Ibikunle Amosun (APC) was elected with 48.5% of the vote in 2019. In April 2022, Amosun announced that he would run for president instead of seeking re-election; however, Amosun withdrew on the date of the APC primary in favour of eventual nominee Bola Tinubu.

General election

Results

Ogun East 

The Ogun East Senatorial District covers the local government areas of Ijebu East, Ijebu North, Ijebu North East, Ijebu Ode, Ikenne, Odogbolu, Ogun Waterside, Remo North, and Sagamu. Incumbent Ramoni Olalekan Mustapha (APC), who was elected with 44.2% of the vote in 2019, initially sought re-election but withdrew from the primary.

General election

Results

Ogun West 

The Ogun West Senatorial District covers the local government areas of Ado-Odo/Ota, Egbado North, Egbado South, Imeko Afon, and Ipokia. Incumbent Tolu Odebiyi (APC), who was elected with 29.4% of the vote in 2019, sought re-election but lost renomination.

General election

Results

See also 
 2023 Nigerian Senate election
 2023 Nigerian elections
 2023 Ogun State elections

References 

Ogun State senatorial elections
2023 Ogun State elections
Ogun State Senate elections